Aghuzchal may refer to:
 Aghuzchal, Langarud, Gilan Province
 Aghuzchal, Mazandaran